"Newborn" is a single by English rock band Elbow and is the third single from their debut album, Asleep in the Back. There were four formats (all of which were released solely in the UK): one CD promo, one 12" vinyl remix promo, 2CD, and 12" vinyl. Several of the songs on the single had been previously on The Newborn EP.

The Genesis song "Entangled" was an influence on the musical arrangement of the song.

Track listing
All releases were released in the UK
CD Promo
 "Newborn" – 7:33

12" Vinyl Remix Promo
 "Newborn" (Press Your Lips El Presidente mix) – 5:57
 "Newborn" (Bitten by the Black Dog) – 4:39

CD1
 "Newborn" (album version) – 7:39
 "One Thing That Was Bothering Me" – 4:50
 "None One" – 3:47

CD2
 "Newborn" (album version) – 7:33
 "Lucky with Disease" – 3:50
 "Newborn" (Press Your Lips El Presidente mix) – 5:57

12" Vinyl
 "Newborn" (Album Version) – 7:33
 "Lucky with Disease" – 3:50
 "Newborn" (Bitten by the Black Dog) – 4:39

References

2000 songs
2001 singles
Elbow (band) songs
Songs written by Guy Garvey
V2 Records singles